Breiter Luzin is a lake in Mecklenburg-Vorpommern, Germany. At an elevation of 84.3 m, its surface area is 3.45 km². It is home to an endemic dwarfed whitefish, Coregonus lucinensis.

References 

Lakes of Mecklenburg-Western Pomerania